"Hold Tight" is a 1981 single by Change from the LP entitled Miracles.  The single's vocals were sung by Diva Gray. Along with the songs "Paradise" and "Heaven of My Life", it became a number one single on the US dance chart for five weeks. It was also the second single released from "Miracles," as "Hold Tight" peaked at number 40 on Billboard's Soul Chart, and number 89 on the Billboard Hot 100.

Track listing
 7" Single
A Hold Tight  3:43  
B Stop For Love  3:50

 12" Single
A Hold Tight (Vocal / Long Version)  4:23  
B Hold Tight (Vocal / Short Version)  3:43

Chart positions

References

1981 singles
Change (band) songs
Songs written by Mauro Malavasi
1981 songs
Atlantic Records singles